Lydia Rose Ellen Kelly (born 25 September 1990 in Manchester, England) is a British actress best known for her portrayal of Lydia Hart in the long-running Channel 4 soap opera Hollyoaks. Kelly departed the show in 2009, with her final scenes airing on 1 January 2010.

References

External links 
 

Living people
British actresses
British television actresses
English soap opera actresses
1990 births